Roberto Dias Correia Filho (born 8 August 1988), commonly known as Roberto Dias, is a Brazilian footballer who plays for Saudi Arabian club Al-Kholood.

Career
Roberto Dias made 17 appearances for América Futebol Clube (RN) in the 2014 Campeonato Brasileiro Série B, but wasn't able to prevent the club from being relegated to Série C.

On 9 June 2022, Dias joined Saudi Arabian club Al-Kholood.

References

External links
Profile at Soccerway

1988 births
Living people
Footballers from São Paulo
Brazilian footballers
Brazilian expatriate footballers
Association football defenders
América Futebol Clube (RN) players
Grêmio Barueri Futebol players
CR Flamengo footballers
Uberaba Sport Club players
Campinense Clube players
F.C. Paços de Ferreira players
FC Astra Giurgiu players
FK Senica players
ŠKF Sereď players
Al-Kholood Club players
Campeonato Brasileiro Série B players
Slovak Super Liga players
Liga de Expansión MX players
Saudi First Division League players
Expatriate footballers in Portugal
Brazilian expatriate sportspeople in Portugal
Expatriate footballers in Slovakia
Brazilian expatriate sportspeople in Slovakia
Expatriate footballers in Mexico
Brazilian expatriate sportspeople in Mexico
Expatriate footballers in Cyprus
Brazilian expatriate sportspeople in Cyprus
Expatriate footballers in Saudi Arabia
Brazilian expatriate sportspeople in Saudi Arabia